The Dukamaje Formation is a geological formation in Niger and Nigeria whose strata date back to the Late Cretaceous. Dinosaur remains are among the fossils that have been recovered from the formation. A wealth of Mosasaur fossils have also been recovered from this formation, particularly from the area around Mt. Igdaman.

Fossil content 

Other reptiles

 Sokotosuchus ianwilsoni
 Palaeophis sp.
 Podocnemis sp.
 Trematochampsa taqueti
 Libycosuchus sp.

Fishes

 Asteracanthus aegyptiacus
 Igdabatis sigmodon
 Lamna nigeriana
 Schizorhiza stromeri
 Stephanodus lybicus
 Stratodus apicalis
 Ischyrhiza nigeriensis
 Ceratodus sp.
 Ginglymostoma sp.
 Pycnodus sp.

See also 
 List of dinosaur-bearing rock formations
 Lists of fossiliferous stratigraphic units in Africa
 List of fossiliferous stratigraphic units in Niger
 Geology of Niger
 Geology of Nigeria

References

Further reading 
 R. T. J. Moody and P. J. C. Suttcliffe. 1991. The Cretaceous deposits of the Iullemmeden Basin of Niger, central West Africa. Cretaceous Research 12:137-157

Geologic formations of Niger
Geologic formations of Nigeria
Upper Cretaceous Series of Africa
Cretaceous Niger
Maastrichtian Stage
Shale formations
Mudstone formations
Shallow marine deposits
Fossiliferous stratigraphic units of Africa
Paleontology in Niger
Paleontology in Nigeria
Tahoua Region
Sokoto State